The Northeast Ohio Conference (NOC) was a high school athletics conference, recognized by the Ohio High School Athletic Association (OHSAA), in northeast Ohio.  Eighteen member schools — each located within the Northeast District of the OHSAA (Class AAA, Divisions I and II) — competed in three six-member divisions: Valley, River and Lake.  Dan Gerome served as the last NOC commissioner.
Anthony J. Paletta designed the conference logo in 2006.

Membership changes

Membership changes (2007–2012)
Following the 2010/11 school year, Mentor High School joined after leaving the Lake Erie League, while Nordonia High School left to join the Suburban League.  Following the 2011/12 school year, Shaker Heights High School joined after leaving the Lake Erie League, while Lakewood High School left to join the West Shore Conference. Listed below are the current 18 member schools.

Membership changes (2013–present)
In November 2013 it was announced that seven schools were leaving the Northeast Ohio Conference to form a new league named the Greater Cleveland Conference. The schools leaving were Elyria, Brunswick, Medina, Mentor, Shaker Heights, Solon and Strongsville. Brush and Mayfield were also invited to join the Greater Cleveland Conference, but decided to join the newly created Western Reserve Conference. Cuyahoga Falls, Hudson, North Royalton, Stow-Munroe Falls and Twinsburg are also leaving to join the Suburban League.

Member schools
Members spanned five Northeast Ohio counties: Cuyahoga, Lake, Lorain, Medina, and Summit.  

(*) Joined the Suburban League in 2015
(~) Joined the Western Reserve Conference in 2015
(^) Joined the Greater Cleveland Conference in 2015
(#) Joined the Great Lakes Conferences in 2015

Membership timeline

Valley, River and Lake Divisions
Divisional breakdowns (listed below) differ depending on the sport; considerations include strength, geography and traditional rivalries

Baseball
Valley Division: Cuyahoga Falls, Hudson, Mayfield, Solon, Stow-Munroe Falls, Twinsburg
River Division: Brunswick, Shaker Heights, Medina, Mentor, Garfield Heights, Strongsville
Lake Division: Brush, North Royalton, Normandy, Parma Senior, Valley Forge

Boys Basketball
Valley Division: Brunswick, Garfield Heights, Medina, Mentor, Shaker Heights, Strongsville
River Division: Brush, Cuyahoga Falls, Hudson, Solon, Stow-Munroe Falls, Strongsville
Lake Division: Elyria, Mayfield, Normandy, North Royalton, Parma Senior, Valley Forge

Girls Basketball
Valley Division: Hudson, Mentor, Shaker Heights, Solon, Stow-Munroe Falls, Twinsburg
River Division: Brunswick, Elyria, Mayfield, Medina, North Royalton, Strongsville
Lake Division: Brush, Cuyahoga Falls, Garfield Heights, Normandy, Parma Senior, Valley Forge

Cross Country
Valley Division: Brunswick, Hudson, Medina, Mentor, Solon, Strongsville
River Division: Cuyahoga Falls, Mayfield, North Royalton, Shaker Heights, Stow-Munroe Falls, Twinsburg
Lake Division: Brush, Elyria, Garfield Heights, Normandy, Parma Senior, Valley Forge

Football
Valley Division: Brunswick, Hudson, Mentor, Solon, Strongsville, Twinsburg
River Division: Elyria, Mayfield, Medina, North Royalton, Shaker Heights, Stow-Munroe Falls
Lake Division: Brush, Cuyahoga Falls, Garfield Heights, Normandy, Parma Senior, Valley Forge

Boys Golf
Valley Division: Brunswick, Elyria, Mayfield, Medina, North Royalton, Strongsville
River Division: Cuyahoga Falls, Hudson, Mentor, Solon, Stow-Munroe Falls, Twinsburg
Lake Division: Brush, Garfield Heights, Normandy, Parma, Shaker Heights, Valley Forge

Girls Golf
Valley Division: Brunswick, Hudson, Medina, North Royalton, Solon, Strongsville
River Division: Cuyahoga Falls, Mayfield, Mentor, Shaker Heights, Stow-Munroe Falls, Twinsburg

Boys Soccer
Valley Division:  Hudson, Medina, Mentor, Solon, Strongsville, Twinsburg
River Division: Brunswick, Brush, Mayfield, North Royalton, Shaker Heights, Stow-Munroe Falls
Lake Division: Cuyahoga Falls, Elyria, Garfield Heights, Normandy, Parma, Valley Forge

Girls Soccer
Valley Division: Brunswick, Hudson, Medina, Mentor, North Royalton, Strongsville
River Division: Cuyahoga Falls, Shaker Heights, Solon, Stow-Munroe Falls, Twinsburg, Valley Forge
Lake Division: Brush, Elyria, Garfield Heights, Mayfield, Normandy, Parma

Girls Softball
Valley Division: Brunswick, Elyria, Medina, North Royalton, Shaker Heights, Strongsville
River Division: Cuyahoga Falls, Hudson, Mentor, Solon, Stow-Munroe Falls, Twinsburg
Lake Division: Brush, Garfield Heights, Mayfield, Normandy, Parma, Valley Forge

Swimming & Diving
Valley Division: Hudson, Mayfield, Mentor, Shaker Heights, Solon, Strongsville
River Division: Brunswick, Cuyahoga Falls, Medina, North Royalton, Stow-Munroe Falls, Twinsburg 
Lake Division: Brush, Elyria, Garfield Heights, Normandy, Parma, Valley Forge

Boys Tennis
Valley Division: Hudson, Medina, Mentor, Shaker Heights, Solon
River Division: Brunswick, Cuyahoga Falls, Mayfield, North Royalton, Strongsville, Twinsburg
Lake Division: Brush, Elyria, Garfield Heights, Normandy, Parma, Stow-Munroe Falls, Valley Forge

Girls Tennis
Valley Division: Hudson, Mayfield, Medina, Mentor, Shaker Heights, Solon
River Division: Brunswick, Cuyahoga Falls, Normandy, North Royalton, Stow-Munroe Falls, Strongsville
Lake Division: Brush, Elyria, Garfield Heights, Parma, Twinsburg, Valley Forge

Track
Valley Division: Brunswick, Medina, Mentor, Shaker Heights, Solon, Twinsburg
River Division: Cuyahoga Falls, Hudson, Mayfield, North Royalton, Stow-Munroe Falls, Strongsville
Lake Division: Brush, Elyria, Garfield Heights, Normandy, Parma Senior, Valley Forge

Volleyball
Valley Division: Brunswick, Elyria, Medina, North Royalton, Solon, Strongsville
River Division: Brush, Garfield Heights, Normandy, Parma, Shaker Heights, Valley Forge
Lake Division: Cuyahoga Falls, Hudson, Mayfield, Mentor, Stow-Munroe Falls, Twinsburg

Wrestling
Valley Division: Elyria, Mayfield, Mentor, Solon, Strongsville, Twinsburg
River Division: Brunswick, Cuyahoga Falls, Hudson, Medina, North Royalton, Stow-Munroe Falls
Lake Division: Brush, Garfield Heights, Normandy, Parma, Shaker Heights, Valley Forge

State championships
This table only includes state championships won by schools while members of the Northeast Ohio Conference.

History
The NOC formed largely by the merging of two eight-member conferences: Pioneer and Western Reserve. Garfield Heights and Lakewood, then members of the Lake Erie League, also joined.  The new conference began play during the 2007-08 school year.

Former Pioneer Conference
See Pioneer Conference

Former Western Reserve Conference
Brush Arcs 
Cuyahoga Falls Black Tigers 
Hudson Explorers 
Mayfield Wildcats 
Nordonia Knights 
Solon Comets 
Stow-Munroe Falls Bulldogs 
Twinsburg Tigers

Sanctioned Sports

Fall
Cross Country - Boys, Girls
Football
Golf - Boys, Girls
Tennis - Girls
Soccer - Boys, Girls
Volleyball - Girls

Winter
Basketball - Boys, Girls
Gymnastics
Swimming & Diving - Boys, Girls
Wrestling

Spring
Baseball
Softball
Tennis - Boys
Track & Field - Boys, Girls

See also
Ohio high school athletic conferences
Ohio High School Athletic Association (OHSAA)

References

External links

Northeast District Athletic Board (NEDAB)
Ohio High School Athletic Association (OHSAA)

Organizations established in 2007
Sports in Greater Cleveland
Ohio high school sports conferences
2007 establishments in Ohio